Henicorhynchus caudimaculatus is a species of ray-finned fish in the genus Henicorhynchus.

References

Henicorhynchus
Fish described in 1934